Sunrise Beach is a coastal suburb in the Shire of Noosa, Queensland, Australia.

Geography 

History
It is within the local government area of Shire of Noosa, but between 2008 and 2013 it was within Sunshine Coast Region.

Amenities
The Shire of Noosa operates a mobile library service on a weekly basis at the Sunrise shops.

Education 
There are no schools in Sunrise Beach. The nearest government primary school is Sunshine Beach State School in neighbouring Sunshine Beach to the north. The nearest government secondary school is Sunshine Beach State High School also in Sunshine Beach.

Notable people
 Mia Wray (born 1995), Australian pop singer and songwriter

References

Further reading 
 

Suburbs of Noosa Shire, Queensland
Beaches of Queensland